A four-part referendum was held in Hungary on 26 November 1989. Voters were asked whether the President should be elected after parliamentary elections, whether organisations related to the Hungarian Socialist Workers' Party should be banned from workplaces, whether the party should account for properties owned or managed by it, and whether the Workers' Militia should be dissolved. All four proposals were passed, the first narrowly by 50.1% of voters, and the remaining three by 95% of voters. Voter turnout was 58.0%.

Results

References

Hungary
1989 in Hungary
Referendums in Hungary